"Know by Now" is a song by English singer Robert Palmer, released in August 1994 as the second single from his twelfth studio album Honey. The song was solely written by Palmer and co-produced by Palmer alongside Stephen Hague.

Background 
Released as the second single from the Honey album, the song fared better than the lead single "Girl U Want". It reached No. 25 in the UK and remained in the charts for five weeks. The single was Palmer's last top 30 entry on the UK singles chart. Although it failed to make any impact in America, the single peaked at No. 23 in Canada.

Release
EMI Records released the single on 7-inch vinyl, cassette, and two CDs in the United Kingdom on 23 August 1994. The main B-side is the non-album track "In the Stars". The main CD single, released in America, Europe, and other territories, is the second CD of the UK set. For most CD versions of the single, a remix of "Know by Now" is also included, created by Pino "Pinaxa" Pischetola, and dubbed the "Pinaxa Mix".

Promotion
A music video was filmed to promote the single. In America, Palmer also performed the song on Jay Leno's The Tonight Show. In the UK, he performed the song on the Michael Ball Show.

Critical reception
Upon its release, Billboard described the song as "a breezy pop/rocker" and added, "His distinctive delivery glides with friendly ease and warmth over an arrangement of plucky guitar lines and a steady, synth-coated beat. He brings colors and tones to this track that haven't turned up on one of his records in years – what a pleasure. A toe-tapper that sticks to the brain after one spin." Andrew Hirst of the Huddersfield Daily Examiner picked it as the "single of the week" and wrote, "Every now and then Palmer releases a single of quality and distinction. This is another one."

In the review for the album Honey, Leslie Mathew of AllMusic commented: "Highlights include "Know by Now," a tasty mid-paced rocker." CD Review said: "In a classier vein "Know by Now" reworks that percolating "Every Breath You Take" groove one more time." In the 1997 book The Virgin Encyclopedia of Seventies Music, Colin Larkin commented: "Honey was another credible release with notable tracks such as "Know by Now" and the title song."

Track listings
7-inch single
 "Know by Now" (radio edit) – 4:01
 "Mercy, Mercy Me" / "I Want You" – 5:58

CD single (UK CD1)
 "Know by Now" (radio edit) – 4:01
 "In the Stars" – 4:51
 "Simply Irresistible" – 4:14
 "Mercy, Mercy Me" / "I Want You" – 5:58

CD single (Europe; UK CD2)
 "Know by Now" (radio edit) – 4:01
 "In the Stars" – 4:51
 "Know by Now" (Pinaxa mix) – 5:26
 "She Makes My Day" – 4:15

CD single (Australia)
 "Know by Now" (radio edit) – 4:01
 "In the Stars" – 4:51
 "Know by Now" (Pinaxa mix) – 5:26
 "She Makes My Day" – 4:15
 "Girl U Want" – 2:24

Personnel
 Robert Palmer – vocals, producer, arranger
 Stephen Hague – producer
 Pino "Pinaxa" Pischetola – mixing, remixer of "Pinaxa Mix"

Charts

References

1994 singles
Robert Palmer (singer) songs
Songs written by Robert Palmer (singer)
1994 songs
EMI Records singles